Toltar is a small village in Nagar region of Nagar District of Gilgit-Baltistan, Pakistan.

Populated places in Nagar District